Ursus Formicarius may refer to:
 a synonym for Ursus arctos (brown bear)
 a synonym for Tamandua tetradactyla (southern tamandua or lesser anteater)